The maximum coverage problem is a classical question in computer science, computational complexity theory, and operations research.
It is a problem that is widely taught in approximation algorithms.

As input you are given several sets and a number . 
The sets may have some elements in common. 
You must select at most  of these sets such that the maximum number of elements are covered, 
i.e. the union of the selected sets has maximal size.

Formally, (unweighted) Maximum Coverage 
 Instance: A number  and a collection of sets .
 Objective: Find a subset  of sets, such that  and the number of covered elements  is maximized.
The maximum coverage problem is NP-hard, and can be approximated within  under standard assumptions. 
This result essentially matches the approximation ratio achieved by the generic greedy algorithm used for  maximization of submodular functions with a cardinality constraint.

ILP formulation
The maximum coverage problem can be formulated as the following integer linear program.

Greedy algorithm 
The greedy algorithm for maximum coverage chooses sets according to one rule: at each stage, choose a set which contains the largest number of uncovered elements.

Known extensions 
The inapproximability results apply to all extensions of the maximum coverage problem since they hold the maximum coverage problem as a special case.

The Maximum Coverage Problem can be applied to road traffic situations; one such example is selecting which bus routes in a public transportation network should be installed with pothole detectors to maximise coverage, when only a limited number of sensors is available. This problem is a known extension of the Maximum Coverage Problem and was first explored in literature by Junade Ali and Vladimir Dyo.

Weighted version 
In the weighted version every element  has a weight  . The task is to find a maximum coverage which has maximum weight.

maximize . (maximizing the weighted sum of covered elements).
; (if  then at least one set  is selected).
; (if  then  is covered)
 (if  then  is selected for the cover).

The greedy algorithm for the weighted maximum coverage at each stage chooses a set that contains the maximum weight of uncovered elements.

Budgeted maximum coverage  
In the budgeted maximum coverage version, not only does every element  have a weight , but also every set  has a cost . Instead of  that limits the number of sets in the cover a budget  is given. This budget  limits the total cost of the cover that can be chosen.

maximize . (maximizing the weighted sum of covered elements).
; (if  then at least one set  is selected).
; (if  then  is covered)
 (if  then  is selected for the cover).

A greedy algorithm will no longer produce solutions with a performance guarantee. Namely, the worst case behavior of this algorithm might be very far from the optimal solution. The approximation algorithm is extended by the following way. First, define a modified greedy algorithm, that selects the set  that has the best ratio of weighted uncovered elements to cost. Second, among covers of cardinality , find the best cover that does not violate the budget. Call this cover . Third, find all covers of cardinality  that do not violate the budget. Using these covers of cardinality  as starting points, apply the modified greedy algorithm, maintaining the best cover found so far. Call this cover . This is the best possible approximation ratio unless .

Generalized maximum coverage  
In the generalized maximum coverage version every set  has a cost , 
element  has a different weight and cost depending on which set covers it.
Namely, if  is covered by set  the weight of 
A budget  is given for the total cost of the solution.

maximize . (maximizing the weighted sum of covered elements in the sets in which they are covered).
; (element  can only be covered by at most one set).
; (if  then at least one set  is selected).
; (if  then  is covered by set )
 (if  then  is selected for the cover).

Generalized maximum coverage algorithm 
The algorithm uses the concept of residual cost/weight. The residual cost/weight is measured against a tentative solution and it is the difference of the cost/weight from the cost/weight gained by a tentative solution.

The algorithm has several stages. First, find a solution using greedy algorithm. In each iteration of the greedy algorithm the tentative solution is added the set which contains the maximum residual weight of elements divided by the residual cost of these elements along with the residual cost of the set. Second, compare the solution gained by the first step to the best solution which uses a small number of sets. Third, return the best out of all examined solutions.

Related problems 
 Set cover problem is to cover all elements with as few sets as possible.

Notes

References 
 

Families of sets
NP-complete problems